Becky Garrison is an American religious satirist and author.
She is a 2013 recipient of a Knight Grant for Reporting on Religion and American Public Life. She was a senior contributing editor for The Wittenburg Door, from 1994 to 2008. With the site's relaunch in 2021, she serves on the Door's Board of Directors and contributes to The Door's Substack. Additional writing credits include work for Spirituality & Health, Only Sky Media, and The Grapevine Magazine (also Beverage Master). She is a member of the Authors Guild.

Education
Garrison earned a bachelor's degree in theater arts at Wake Forest University.
She received an M.Div. from Yale Divinity School and an M.S.W. from Columbia University.

Books
 Washington Distilled: A Guided History. The History Press (Spring 2024, forthcoming).

References

External links
 

American political writers
American satirists
American humorists
Christian writers
Living people
Yale Divinity School alumni
Wake Forest University alumni
Columbia University School of Social Work alumni
21st-century American women writers
American women non-fiction writers
21st-century American non-fiction writers
Women satirists
Year of birth missing (living people)